The Elm cultivar Ulmus 'Tiliaefolia' was first mentioned by Host in Flora Austriaca (1827), as Ulmus tiliaefolia [:linden-leaved]. The Späth nursery of Berlin distributed a 'Tiliaefolia' from the late 19th century to the 1930s as neither an U. montana hybrid nor a field elm (U. campestris) cultivar, but simply as Ulmus tiliaefolia, suggesting uncertainty about its status. Herbarium specimens appear to show two clones, one smaller-leaved and classified as a field elm cultivar, the other larger-leaved (see 'External links').

Description
The tree was said to have ovate leaves, rounded or subcordate and not usually strongly oblique at the base. Host said the leaf was biserrate. The catalogue of the Späth nursery, Berlin, describes 'Tiliifolia' [:'Tiliaefolia'] as having smooth shiny dark green leaves.

Pests and diseases
'Tiliaefolia' is not known to have any resistance to Dutch elm disease.

Cultivation
No examples of 'Tiliaefolia' are known to survive. Reichenbach noted briefly that the tree was once grown in Bohemia and Austria. One tree was planted in 1898, as U. tiliifolia, at the Dominion Arboretum, Ottawa, Canada. Three specimens were supplied by the Späth nursery to the Royal Botanic Garden Edinburgh in 1902 as U. tiliifolia, and may still exist in Edinburgh as it was the practice of the Garden to distribute trees about the city (viz. the Wentworth Elm); the current list of Living Accessions held in the Garden per se does not list the plant. A specimen obtained from Späth before 1914, and planted in 1916, stood in the Ryston Hall arboretum, Norfolk, in the early 20th century.

Putative specimens
A tree with leaves matching herbarium specimens of 'Tiliaefolia' stood in Dyke Road, Brighton, till 2012.

An old elm with leaves close to herbarium specimens of Späth's 'Tiliaefolia', stands (2016) in Belgrave Cescent Gardens, Edinburgh.

References

External links

Smaller-leaved form
  Sheet labelled Ulmus tiliafolia Host, Austria (samarae and leaves)
  Sheet described as U. carpinifolia var. tiliaefolia
  Sheet described as U. carpinifolia var. tiliaefolia

Larger-leaved form
  Sheet described as U. tiliaefolia, RBGE specimen from Späth nursery, 1902
  Sheet described as U. tiliaefolia, RBGE specimen from Späth nursery, 1902
  Sheet described as U. tiliaefolia (Späth) 
  Sheet described as U. glabra Hudson tiliaefolia (Späth) (1931)
  Sheet described as U. scabra [:U. glabra Hudson] tiliaefolia (1900)
  Sheet labelled U. 'Tiliafolia' Host, specimen from Moulin de Fourges (Oise) (1971)
  Sheet described as U. Wentworthii pendula, but possibly 'Tiliaefolia' 
  Sheet described as U. Wentworthii pendula, but possibly 'Tiliaefolia'

Ulmus articles missing images
Ulmus
Missing elm cultivars